This is a list of people who formerly served as Lord Lieutenant of the County of London.

The post was created in 1889, absorbing the duties of the Lord Lieutenant of the Tower Hamlets, and abolished in 1965, when it was merged with that of Lord Lieutenant of Middlesex to become the Lord Lieutenant of Greater London.

Hugh Grosvenor, 1st Duke of Westminster 1 April 1889 – 22 December 1899
Alexander Duff, 1st Duke of Fife 12 February 1900 – 12 January 1912
Robert Crewe-Milnes, 1st Marquess of Crewe 24 June 1912 – 5 July 1944
Gerald Wellesley, 7th Duke of Wellington 5 July 1944 – 13 September 1949
Archibald Wavell, 1st Earl Wavell 13 September 1949 – 24 May 1950
Alan Brooke, 1st Viscount Alanbrooke 23 August 1950 – 25 April 1957
Harold Alexander, 1st Earl Alexander of Tunis 17 May 1957 – 1965

See also
High Sheriff of the County of London

References

London
History of local government in London (1889–1965)
1889 establishments in England
1965 disestablishments in England
Lists of political office-holders in London